Ohab Zedek, sometimes abbreviated as OZ, is an Orthodox Jewish synagogue in Manhattan, New York City noted for its lively, youthful congregation. Founded in 1873, it moved to its current location on West 95th Street in 1926. The current clergy are:  Rabbi Allen Schwartz, Senior Rabbi and Rabbi Jack Varon, assistant Rabbi.

Early history

Congregation Ohab Zedek (abbreviated O.Z., and formally known as the First Hungarian Congregation Ohab Zedek), was founded in 1873 on the Lower East Side. The congregation built a synagogue building at 70 Columbia Street in 1881.  In 1886 the congregation sold the Columbia Street building to Congregation Ahavath Acheim Anshe Ungarn and moved into  the gothic-style synagogue building 172 Norfolk Street that is now the Angel Orensanz Center, the oldest surviving synagogue building in New York and the fourth-oldest in the United States. Rabbi Philip Klein served as its rabbi from 1890 to his death in 1926.

116th Street building

In 1906–07 the congregation built and moved into a "monumental" building on 116th Street, in the newly fashionable neighborhood of Harlem.  The "monumental" design was influenced by the Gothic character of the previous Norfolk Street home. The street-facing gable prominently featured a large four-centered arch-headed window over a large pedimented doorcase, appearing styled in loose or Vernacular Gothic on the interface of Moorish Revival architecture.

The famous singer Yossele Rosenblatt was a cantor there from 1911 to 1926, and again in 1929.

In 1926 O.Z. moved to its present building at 118 West 95th Street; the 116th Street property was sold, eventually becoming the Baptist Temple Church, which occupied the location for over five decades. Conversion into a church removed the Jewish-themed terracotta ornaments.

Costly structural damage necessitated the building's demolition, which occurred slowly throughout late 2009 and early 2010.

Current building, West 95th Street
The current synagogue building at 118 West 95th Street (constructed in 1926) is noted for its Moorish Revival architecture.  Designed by architect Charles B. Myers, the interior features magnificent Mudéjar style plasterwork.  The building was listed on the National Register of Historic Places in 2017.

Early today 21st century
Early in the 21st century, the congregation became known for attracting large numbers of orthodox Jewish singles to its services and programs. The congregation published a book in 2005 about its history, First Hungarian Congregation Ohab Zedek, written by O.Z. member Chaim Steinberger.

Currently, the senior Rabbi is Allen Schwartz and the executive director is Chad Hopkovitz.

References

External links

Synagogue website

Hungarian-American culture in New York City
Hungarian-Jewish culture in New York (state)
Synagogues completed in 1926
Moorish Revival synagogues
Modern Orthodox synagogues in the United States
Religious organizations established in 1873
Synagogues in Manhattan
Upper West Side
Orthodox synagogues in New York City
Moorish Revival architecture in New York City
Properties of religious function on the National Register of Historic Places in Manhattan